The Luxembourg Football Federation (FLF) is the governing body of football in Luxembourg. It organises the Luxembourg Football League and the Luxembourg national football team. It is based in Mondercange, to the south of Luxembourg City.

List of presidents
 Max Metz (1908–1913)
 Jules Fournelle (1913–1915)
 René Leclère (1915–1917)
 J. Geschwind (1917–1918)
 Guillaume Lemmer (1918–1920)
 Gustave Jacquemart (1921–1950)
 Émile Hamilius (1950–1961)
 Albert Kongs (1961–1968)
 René Van Den Bulcke (1969–1981)
 Remy Wagner (1981–1986)
 Norbert Konter (1986–1998)
 Henri Roemer (1998–2004)
 Paul Philipp (2004 – present day)

Current squad

External links
 Luxembourg Football Federation official website
 Luxembourg at FIFA site
Luxembourg at UEFA site

Football in Luxembourg
Luxembourg
Football Federation
Mondercange
Sports organizations established in 1908
1908 establishments in Luxembourg